The flugelhorn, also spelled fluegelhorn, flugel horn, or flügelhorn, is a brass instrument that resembles the trumpet and cornet but has a wider, more conical bore. Like trumpets and cornets, most flugelhorns are pitched in B, though some are in C. It is a type of valved bugle, developed in Germany in the early 19th century from a traditional English valveless bugle. The first version of a valved bugle was sold by Heinrich Stölzel in Berlin in 1828. The valved bugle provided Adolphe Sax (creator of the saxophone) with the inspiration for his B soprano (contralto) saxhorns, on which the modern-day flugelhorn is modeled.

Etymology
The German word Flügel means wing or flank in English. In early 18th century Germany, a ducal hunt leader known as a Flügelmeister blew the Flügelhorn, a large semicircular brass or silver valveless horn, to direct the wings of the hunt. Military use dates from the Seven Years' War, where this instrument was employed as a predecessor of the bugle.

Structure and variants

The flugelhorn is generally pitched in B, like most trumpets and cornets. It usually has three piston valves and employs the same fingering system as other brass instruments, although four-valve versions and rotary-valve versions also exist. It can therefore be played by trumpet and cornet players, although it has different playing characteristics. The flugelhorn's mouthpiece is more deeply conical than either trumpet or cornet mouthpieces, but not as conical as a French horn mouthpiece. The shank of the flugelhorn mouthpiece is similar in size to a cornet mouthpiece shank.

Some modern flugelhorns feature a fourth valve that lowers the pitch by a perfect fourth (similar to the fourth valve on some euphoniums, tubas, and piccolo trumpets, or the trigger on trombones). This adds a useful low range that, coupled with the flugelhorn's dark sound, extends the instrument's abilities. Players can also use the fourth valve in place of the first and third valve combination (which is somewhat sharp).

A compact version of the rotary valve flugelhorn is the oval shaped kuhlohorn in B. It was developed for the German protestant trombone choirs.

A pair of bass flugelhorns in C, called fiscorns, are played in the Catalan cobla bands which provide music for sardana dancers.

Timbre
The tone is fatter and usually regarded as more mellow and dark than the trumpet or cornet. The sound of the flugelhorn has been described as halfway between a trumpet and a French horn, whereas the cornet's sound is halfway between a trumpet and a flugelhorn. The flugelhorn is as agile as the cornet but more difficult to control in the high register (from approximately written G5), where in general it locks onto notes less easily.

Use and performances

The flugelhorn is a standard member of the British-style brass band, and it is also used frequently in jazz. It also appears occasionally in orchestral and concert band music. Famous orchestral works with flugelhorn include Igor Stravinsky's Threni, Ralph Vaughan Williams's Ninth Symphony, and Michael Tippett's third symphony. The flugelhorn is sometimes substituted for the post horn in Mahler's Third Symphony, and for the soprano Roman buccine in Ottorino Respighi's Pines of Rome. In HK Gruber's trumpet concerto Busking (2007) the soloist is directed to play a flugelhorn in the slow middle movement. The flugelhorn figured prominently in many of Burt Bacharach's 1960s pop song arrangements. It is featured in a solo role in Bert Kaempfert's 1962 recording of "That Happy Feeling". Flugelhorns have occasionally been used as the alto or low soprano voice in a drum and bugle corps.

Another use of the flugelhorn is found in the Dutch and Belgian "Fanfareorkesten" or fanfare orchestras. In these orchestras the flugelhorns, often between 10 and 20 in number, have a significant role, forming the base of the orchestra. They are pitched in B, with sporadically an E soloist. Due to poor intonation, these E flugelhorns are mostly replaced by the E trumpet or cornet.

The 1996 film Brassed Off features a flugelhorn performance of Rodrigo's Concierto de Aranjuez, Adagio, as a key moment. The solo is played by Paul Hughes.

Notable players

Joe Bishop, as a member of the Woody Herman band in 1936, was one of the earliest jazz musicians to use the flugelhorn. Shorty Rogers and Kenny Baker began playing it in the early fifties, and Clark Terry used it in Duke Ellington's orchestra in the mid-1950s. Chet Baker recorded several albums on the instrument in the 1950s and 1960s. Miles Davis further popularized the instrument in jazz on the albums Miles Ahead and Sketches of Spain, (both arranged by Gil Evans) though he did not use it much on later projects. Other prominent flugelhorn players include Donald Byrd, Freddy Buzon, Freddie Hubbard, Tom Browne, Lee Morgan, Bill Dixon, Wilbur Harden, Art Farmer, Roy Hargrove, Randy Brecker, Hugh Masekela, Feya Faku, Tony Guerrero, Gary Lord, Jimmy Owens, Maynard Ferguson, Terumasa Hino, Woody Shaw, Guido Basso, Kenny Wheeler, Tom Harrell, Bill Coleman, Thad Jones, Arturo Sandoval, Lee Loughnane of the rock band Chicago, Roddy Lorimer of The Kick Horns, Mike Metheny, Harry Beckett, Till Brönner and Ack van Rooyen. Most jazz flugelhorn players use the instrument as an auxiliary to the trumpet, but in the 1970s Chuck Mangione gave up playing the trumpet and concentrated on the flugelhorn alone, notably on his jazz-pop hit song "Feels So Good". Mangione, in an interview on ABC during the 1980 Winter Olympics, for which he wrote the theme "Give It All You Got", referred to the flugelhorn as "the right baseball glove".

Pop flugelhorn players include Probyn Gregory (Brian Wilson Band), Ronnie Wilson of the Gap Band, Rick Braun, Mic Gillette, Jeff Oster, Zach Condon of the band Beirut, Scott Spillane of the band Neutral Milk Hotel, Terry Kirkman of the band The Association, and Rashawn Ross of the band Dave Matthews Band.  Marvin Stamm played the flugelhorn solo on "Uncle Albert/Admiral Halsey" by Paul and Linda McCartney.

Classical flugelhorn players include Sergei Nakariakov and Kirill Soldatov.

Footnotes

References

External links

 An overview and brief history of the flugelhorn, including a short sound clip
 How to play a flugelhorn at TheTrumpetBlog.com

B-flat instruments
Brass instruments
Horns